Daniel José Santomé Lemus (born 31 October 1993), better known by his username Dalas Review, or simply Dalas, is a Spanish YouTuber with more than 10 million subscribers on his main channel. He has also authored two novels, Fugitives in Time (2016) and The Ink. Beyond the Magic (2017). In 2017, he also released a video game called Fur Fun on Steam, which has been unavailable since 2018 due to a lot of critics for the lame gameplay and many bugs in the beta version.

Early life 
Daniel José Santomé Lemus was born on 31 October 1993 in Santa Cruz de Tenerife. He was introduced to computers when he was three and around the age of 11–12, he got into 3D modelling and photo editing. He later enrolled in a multimedia degree, but decided to drop out.

Career

Internet career
In 2005, when the YouTube platform was created, Dalas started grabbing film trailers in other languages to put "subtitles that didn't make any sense". "Dalas" is a combination of the first two letters of his first name, the first letter of his second last name and the first two letters of his first name the other way around. He started his career in 2010 with a channel named DTeamVlogs, achieving virality with a video criticizing Justin Bieber's fans named "La niña believer". His main channel "Dalas Review" was created in 2012. In July 2017, Dalas won the Tolete Award for his parody of the Canarian accent in a video entitled "Imitating 15 accents of Spain and Latin America (Very Bad)". In January 2021 he created a Pornhub account where he intended to upload videos about sexual education.

Writing career
In 2016, he published Fugitivos en el tiempo (Fugitives in Time), a science fiction novel starring Uriel and based on time travel. It sold 16,000 units in four editions. He signed several copies of his book in Málaga. In November 2017, he published La tinta. Más allá de la magia, a novel that tells the story of Sveia, a young woman misunderstood both by her environment and by the bad relationship with her parents and classmates, but who would soon find herself immense in a magical world inhabited by supernatural creatures. During the book's launch, Dalas stated that instead of the traditional book signings, she would hold some kind of shows that will include activities including reading a snippet from her book.

Stardeos
In August 2021, he released the beta version of the video website Stardeos, for which he invested in for a total of nine months, and that he would try to be more permissive with the creators, in addition they would receive higher income than on other platforms. Among the main premises of the website were not to censor videos and not to remove channels, unless a judge dictates it, on other hand the videos will not be demonetized.

During the first four hours after the release, the website was down due to high traffic of more than 150,000 users per minute. This is due to the fact that the capacity of the servers that Dalas hired could not support large amounts of connected users. In October 2021, Stardeos was back online, while Wrixy, a website dedicated to publishing literary content, went offline due to Dallas being unable to pay maintenance costs within five days. In October 2021, he uploaded a video complaining about the various problems he had both with 200 people who worked on the project and with companies he contacted.

During the development of Stardeos, he also contacted some YouTubers and streamers like AriGameplays and JuanSGuarnizo to ask them to upload videos to the platform. In March 2022, he uploaded a video to Stardeos in which he insulted, scorned, and physically threatened alleged Twitter haters. He also affirm that he would upload videos of the same style but for paid subscribers. In June 2022, he uploaded the first paid Stardeos video accusing Ari of being unfaithful to Guarnizo with The Grefg.

Other works
Dalas has worked on some video game projects like: Fur Fun, an adventure and platform video game in 3D, released via Steam on February 10, 2017, and developed by a friend of Dalas named Doky, using the program Unreal Engine 4. The origin of the development began in September 2016 with a campaign of Kickstarter, under the title of "Kewpie - Jazzy", a video game strongly inspired by those of Rare. The project aimed to raise 92,000 euros, however only 650 would be raised. Dalas would then take the project and, in December 8 of that year, it would return under the new name "Fur Fun". After its official launch on Steam, received generally negative reviews and in January 2018, he announced that he would remove the game from Steam. During 2020 and 2021, Dalas was looking for programmers to help in the development of "Fur Fun 2".

On December 23, 2021, Daniel, after having a private conversation with an anonymous person, claimed to have received 10 million euros worth of Bitcoin from the anonymous individual, Dalas's plan has been for a long time to raise as much money as possible to open his laboratory with one objective in mind, stopping ageing, the donor only sent the bitcoins because he wanted them to be used on the research to stop ageing. After the announcement, a series of videos followed suit in which he investigated the source of the bitcoins and who sent them, after finding a hidden message he discovered that the person who sent the bitcoins was from Sinaloa, Mexico. After the discovery no more videos about the donation have been published. His plans to create the laboratory, however, have shifted; he now wants to achieve his goals thanks to machine-learning AI.

Personal life 
He has a sister, Ariadna Cabrero Lemus, known on social media as Ariann Music. As 2018, Dalas lives in Ireland with his ex girlfriend Damaris Pérez known as Lizy P, a fashion and make-up YouTuber, to "basically save us taxes." In July 2019, Dalas underwent rhinoplasty. Daniel has been controversial for several of his comments on politics: he has publicly shown his support for the Republican politician, Donald Trump for his decision to designate Antifa as a terrorist group. He also supported the Spanish right-wing party Vox. 

He has also been critical of socialism, progressive leftist movements in Spain and of taxes, criticizing statism. He was also criticized for alleged "misogynistic, homophobic and racist comments."  In a video uploaded in September 2021, he stated that even if habits are changed, it will be impossible to stop climate change. On August 17, 2022, his stepfather died of stage 4 liver cancer with metastasis. After this event, he criticized the health system due to the treatment given to him by health professionals.

Controversies

Dalas, Argos and Miare (2016-2021) 
The relationship between Daniel Santomé Lemus and María Rubio Sánchez (Miare) ended in March 2016 and Naya Chimlova published a video where she explained why they had finished (currently that video is not available). However, on April 19, 2016, Daniel uploaded a video titled "estoy harto de mentiras y por eso hago este vídeo" in which he responds to Miare and her accusations against him of being a "stalker". In August 2016, Interviu published "You're useless, you're a whore", a headline that shows fragments of the complaint that Miare filed against Dalas in July of that same year in a Barcelona court.

On other hand Miare was left with a greyhound named Argos which was adopted in 2015, which is why Dalas sued her to return her dog in June 2016, after having had the trial in July 2017, Dalas won the lawsuit and Miare was forced to return the dog to Dalas. However, Miare uploaded a half-hour video explaining why she did not agree with the judicial sentence, in addition shows some supposed WhatsApp conversations in which Dalas admitted to having mistreated the dog. These conversations were denied by Dalas in a video uploaded on July 12, 2017 "tenía otro vídeo preparado, pero este mal rollo nunca acabará". In July 2017, several users such as Anne Reburn, Aida Explorer or Mel Dominguez (focusinvlogs) uploaded videos recounting their alleged cases with Dalas.  On other hand Miare went to explain her version to Fina Brunet on TV3's Els Matins.

On December 28, 2018, Dalas, Lizy P and some two of his friends went to the Sant Joan Despí neighborhood, Barcelona, where they found Miare's mother walking the animal to demand that they return the dog. At that moment, allegedly, the father of his ex María gave a strong punch to Lizy and her mother bit in her back a friend of Dalas who was there at the time. This fact led to Lizy P ending up in the emergency room due to pain. In August 2019, he uploaded a video announcing that he denounced Miare for the crime of false complaint.

According to Miare's version, she lost Argos and her family adopted a twin named Marlos and Dalas put a complaint against Miare and her mother for misappropriation of the animal, based on that dog was actually Argos. On February 3, 2021, the complaint for misappropriation of Argos against Miare and his mother was ultimately archived after an expert assured that the dog was not Argos. Dalas uploaded on April 23 a 56-minute video in which he assure that the expert had been convinced to made the report where they denied that they were the same dog. On the other hand, Miare published a tweet talking about the complaint. On April 27 he uploaded other video in which he shows how the veterinarian retracted the statement he showed a few months ago, also giving weight to the possibility that this dog is Argos.

Overall problems with Wismichu

Así es Dalas Review (2017-2018) 
On October 4, 2017, Wismichu uploaded a video titled "Así es Dalas Review", it as of February 2021 has 20 million views, and in which apart from bringing out the "miseries" of Dalas Review, he accuses of having several complaints for gender violence, and hints that he fled  to Ireland to escape the Spanish law. He also refers to him with the pejorative phrases "miserable", "psychopath", "hyena", "bad person", "wretch" and "bastard".

After the Wismichu video, Daniel lost around 310,000 subscribers, going from having 5,700,000 to 5,390,000, this made Dalas Review hide his channel's subscriber count temporarily. On October 5, he padlocked his Twitter account, however on October 6, it would be available again, and his YouTube channel was subsequently deleted. However, his channel's deletion would not last long, since a few hours later Dalas's channel was reinstated.

In March 2018, he would have an interview with Los Replicantes, in which he talked about a video in which he would show court documents and evidence that would disprove the lies told against him. On 18 May 2018, Santomé published "se acabó, wismichu e ingrid", also known as "el video definitivo", an hour and forty minutes video in which he denied, all one by one, the accusations made by Wismichu and his ex-girlfriend, Ingrid Míchel (also known as "SoyMia").

Complaint against Wismichu (2018-2021) 

In 2018, Daniel sued Ismael for the alleged crime of libel and slander committed in the video "Así es Dalas Review", claiming a penalty of nine months in jail, and a 15,000 euros fine. At the end of 2019 Santomé uploaded to his main channel a video titled "Denuncié a Wismichu", video in which he talks about the lawsuit filed a year earlier against Prego for the video that "damaged his career".

After several months of that video, on December 17, 2020, the trial was finally held where it would be analyzed whether or not Wismichu actually slandered Dalas. In 2021, the 25th criminal court of Barcelona acquitted Ismael of the accusations of slander and insults perpetuated by Daniel.

Video series against Wismichu 
On February 11, 2021, Dalas uploaded a video accusing Ismael of having a criminal record, because he was sentenced to 6 months in prison for cutting off the head of a 21-year-old with a glass bottle. In said video, he assures that he had access to Ismael's criminal history because he denounced him, and also that it was not made public because Prego had silenced the Spanish judicial system. He also claims to have in her possession audio files of Ingrid where she accuses Ismael of being an alleged abuser.

During the 2021 controversy he accused Ismael of searching for teenagers to ask them to strip naked, with the intention of recording them and publishing them on their website without censorship via Chatroulette. On the other hand, he made an appeal to speak with any of his alleged victims to present his case, and as a consequence, an alleged victim appeared in a video on February 16 to report that when she was 14 years old, she showed her breasts with a friend of hers in one of Ismael's recordings.

Child grooming allegations 
In April 2018, a 15-year-old Argentine girl named Olivia shared on her Twitter account several screenshots, videos, and live streams of the alleged conversations she had with Dalas in 2016, the year in which she was supposedly about 13 years old. She also pointed out that he sent his semi-nude pool photos on Instagram.. This topic was addressed by the Mexican youtuber Diego De La Mataz, most known as Mexivergas, in a livestream with Dalas from March of that same year. In 2021, Fabían Pasos, a YouTuber known as Mafian TV interviews this alleged victim from Dalas in a video titled "La Verdad Oscura de Dalas Review" (The dark truth about Dalas Review). Olivia, known on social networks as Olita de Mar, affirmed that Dalas supposedly contacted his father to intimidate him. On November 1, 2020, a Twitter psychologist known as Heleven published a thread in which she talks about the concept of "parasocial grooming" and explains how, according to her, Dalas is supposedly an example of this practice. In that same thread she also gives an example to the American YouTuber Shane Dawson.

Complaint of child sexual abuse 
Dalas was denounced for "child sexual cyberbullying and sexual abuse". On 30 November 2018, Daniel Santomé was tried for that crime against 13-year-old child. The Madrid prosecutor's office asked for 5 years in prison, 11 of disqualification, and 9 years of estrangement. According to the testimony of the minor of 13, she and Dalas began to communicate through Twitter in 2015 and Dalas sent her a photo of his naked torso.

They did not meet in person until 26 January 2016, when she attended a signing of her book Fugitivos en el tiempo held in Madrid, Spain. Both continued talking on WhatsApp and on 8 February 2016, he accompanied her at the Atocha station where he supposedly kissed her and proposed to go to her hotel. Later he went to the Retiro park, place where he allegedly kissed her and touched her vaginal area and her breasts.

Dalas defended himself by saying that the topless photo had already been published before, however he admitted that they did indeed meet in person in 2016 during his book signing. He affirmed that in Atocha he was only about 15 minutes to be able to sign a book that he failed to sign. He denied that they went to the Retiro park and the sexual encounter that supposedly occurred there.

On the other hand, Dalas flatly denied having had any sexual interest in her. He also stated that he talked a lot with her because she claimed to have both problems at school and abuse from her mother. In December 2018, the Provincial Court of Madrid acquitted Daniel Santomé due to lack of evidence after the evidence.

References

Bibliography

External links 
 Dalas Review's channel on YouTube
 Dalas Review at Twitter
 Dalas Review at Twitch
 Dalas Review judgment of December 17, 2018 published by El País

1993 births
Living people
Spanish-language YouTubers
Spanish anti-communists
Spanish emigrants to Ireland
Spanish YouTubers
People of Canarian descent
YouTube channels launched in 2012